The Ofakim railway station is a railway station situated in Ofakim, Israel. It is located on the Ashkelon–Beersheba railway between Netivot and Beersheba and was opened to the public on December 31, 2015. Next to the station, a new neighbourhood with affordable prices, specially designed for young people, is planned to be built by a NGO called Noah Initiative. The neighbourhood is designed as a Transit-oriented district, so the train will play a pivotal role in allowing the residents to live in the district while working in Beersheba or in the center of Israel.

References

External links
 

Railway stations in Southern District (Israel)
Railway stations opened in 2015
2015 establishments in Israel